The Porter County Conference (PCC) is an athletic conference made up of eight Indiana high schools.  Five of the eight schools are within Porter County, Indiana. The three remaining are in LaPorte County.

The PCC was originally formed in 1933, as the Porter County schools split off from the Lake-Porter County Conference. The conference included all of the schools inside the county except for Valparaiso. A major shakeup occurred in 1958, as Portage and Chesterton grew too large for the other remaining schools and left. Membership dropped to six schools when Jackson Township and Liberty Township consolidated into Chesterton High School in 1969. Hanover Central joined the PCC for the school year of 1972–1973. For the 1975–1976 school year, La Crosse (renamed Tri-Township in 2022) and Westville joined the PCC. Westville left the PCC after the 1997–1998 school year for the Northland Athletic Conference (now defunct). Wheeler left after the 2002–2003 school year for the Lake Athletic Conference (now defunct); South Central joined the PCC for the 2003–2004 school year in Wheeler's place. Hanover Central announced in 2012 that it would leave the PCC in to join the Greater South Shore Conference. The PCC allowed Hanover Central to leave a year early in 2013, and voted to readmit Westville, who had been an independent since the demise of the Northland Conference.

Five PCC members are in Class A, the smallest enrollment class, two are in Class 2A and one is in Class 3A. Only two PCC members (Boone Grove and South Central) offer football. Boone Grove and South Central participate in the Greater South Shore Conference in football only.

Members

Current members

 Hebron played concurrently in the PCC and the Kankakee Valley Conference 1933–67.
 Kouts played concurrently in the PCC and KVC 1933–59.
 Westville played in the Northland Conference from 1998 to 2008, then as an Independent from 2008 until rejoining in 2013.

Former Members

 Concurrent with Lake-Porter County Conference 1933–49.
 Concurrent with Calumet Conference 1949–58.

Membership timeline

Conference Champions

Boys Basketball

Girls Basketball

State Championships

Boone Grove (1)
 2018 Baseball (2A)

Hanover Central (1)
 2004 Softball (2A)

Morgan Township (1)
1999 Softball (A)

Washington Township
2021 Baseball (A)

Traditions

The Porter County Conference Victory Keg 
The Porter County Conference Victory Keg, commonly referred to as “The Keg”, is the PCC's traveling trophy for boys basketball. The Keg is circulated through the wins and losses of the member schools of the PCC. Anytime a school possessing The Keg plays another PCC school, the game is played for possession of The Keg. The Keg is painted the color of the school that holds possession, usually by the faculty and students of the winning school. Twelve schools have bared their colors on the coveted Victory Keg.

In 1957, Morgan Township coach Elwyn Stuber suggested a boys basketball traveling trophy on behalf of the Morgan Township class of 1959. The traveling trophy was intended to be circulated among the eight smaller schools in Porter County. Hebron High School custodian Wayne Fry donated an old water keg to be used. Hebron wood shop teacher Kenneth Schiek and his students sanded and cleaned up the old water keg.

The names of all eight schools were put into hat to decide who would be the first to possess The Keg. Wheeler High School would win the draw, and The Keg was painted in Wheeler's green and orange color scheme for the first game. It would make its debut on November 15, 1957, at Wheeler in a matchup featuring Wheeler and Boone Grove. Boone Grove won the game 52–42 to be the first team to take control of The Keg.

The Keg has changed hands more than 200 times. The Westville Blackhawks currently control the keg.

The Porter County Conference Victory Kup 

The Porter County Conference Victory Kup, commonly known as “The Kup” is the PCC's traveling trophy for girls basketball. The Kup is circulated through the wins and losses of the member schools of the PCC. Anytime a school possessing The Kup plays another PCC school, the game is played for possession of The Kup. The Kup is painted the color of the school that holds possession, usually by the faculty and students of the winning school.

Wheeler High School Principal Charles Kennedy and Athletic Director Girls Basketball Coach suggested a traveling trophy originally intended for the PCC Girls Basketball tournament. Wheeler High School shop teacher Wayne Herlitz made The Kup and a plaque was donated by Hebron High School coach Paul Schroeder as The Kup wasn't allowed to be painted originally.

The Kup made its debut during the 1974-75 PCC Girls’ Basketball Tournament, Wheeler held possession for the first game against Washington Township High School. Washington Township would win the first “Kup Game” 42–25.

In 1980 the principals and athletic directors of the PCC member schools decided to make The Kup the traveling trophy of all PCC girls basketball games, like the PCC Victory Keg. In 1998 Morgan Township High School was the first team to paint The Kup in their school colors, becoming a tradition ever since.

The Kup is currently controlled by the South Central High School Satellites.

Resources 
 IHSAA Conferences
 IHSAA Directory

External links 
 Porter County Conference Website

Indiana high school athletic conferences
High school sports conferences and leagues in the United States